Tom Clancy's Rainbow Six is a 1998 tactical shooter video game developed and published by Red Storm Entertainment for Microsoft Windows, with later ports for the Nintendo 64, PlayStation, Mac OS, Game Boy Color, and Dreamcast. It is the first installment in the Rainbow Six series. Based on the Tom Clancy novel of the same name, the game follows Rainbow, a secret international counterterrorist organization, and the conspiracy they unravel as they handle a seemingly random spike in terrorism.

In singleplayer, the player advances through a series of missions in a campaign. The player is briefed on the situation, selects and organizes their operatives and equipment, and plans their approach and movement through the level. The player controls one operative leading computer-controlled teammates, and can switch between other operatives at will. In multiplayer, players cooperate to complete missions or battle to complete objectives.

Rainbow Six received positive reviews from critics, though the console ports received relatively lower ratings than the PC port. For most versions, praise was directed toward gameplay, multiplayer, and immersion, while criticism mainly centered on AI issues, glitches, and the graphics and controls of some ports. In its first year of release, it sold over 200,000 copies, accounting to $8.86 million in revenue. Rainbow Six is considered a milestone in the history of first-person shooters and made a lasting impact on the then-fledgling tactical shooter genre.

An expansion pack, Tom Clancy's Rainbow Six Mission Pack: Eagle Watch, was released on January 31, 1999. A sequel, Tom Clancy's Rainbow Six: Rogue Spear, was released in 1999.

Gameplay 

Rainbow Six is a tactical shooter, in which characters are affected by realistic factors and can be killed with a single bullet; therefore, wise tactics and planning are encouraged to complete missions over sheer force and firepower.

Before each mission is a planning stage, in which the player is briefed on the situation, chooses the Rainbow operatives to be involved in the mission, organizes them into color-coded teams, and selects their weapons, equipment, and uniforms. Operatives are categorized into five classes based on their skill specializations: Assault, Demolitions, Electronics, Recon, and Sniper. In the planning stage, the player is shown a map of the area of operations to set team orders, such as AI pathing, team "go" codes to hold until ordered, where AI operatives will deploy equipment such as flashbangs or door breaching charges, and rules of engagement.

The game follows a campaign of several missions, with the plot being advanced in the mission briefing of each. Missions in each port differ: the PC, PlayStation, and Game Boy Color ports have 16 missions, the Nintendo 64 port has 12 missions, and the Dreamcast port has 21 missions. Objectives in missions include defeating enemies, rescuing hostages, defusing bombs, gathering intelligence, and planting surveillance devices. Players are encouraged to find their own ways to complete objectives using a variety of tactics and methods, ranging from stealthy infiltration to a frontal assault (except in missions where stealth is mandatory). Successful missions often last just minutes, but may require dozens of repetitions and planning changes to account for failures, new plans, or simply faster or more streamlined completion.

During gameplay, the player controls one operative directly, and can see stats for that operative and their team on the HUD. Operatives and teams not under player control follow the orders given to them in the planning stage. The player can take control of any alive team leader at will. Injured operatives cannot be healed during a mission and require time off to heal (they can still be used, just with lower health), while deceased operatives are permanently gone and cannot be used for the rest of the campaign playthrough, forcing players to plan carefully to avoid casualties.

Online multiplayer for the PC port was available on the MPlayer.com and Zone.com services. Multiplayer modes include cooperative modes, deathmatch, and team deathmatch, among others. Most other console ports lack multiplayer, though the Nintendo 64 port includes a two-player split-screen cooperative mode.

Most ports of Rainbow Six have only minimal differences to each other, such as the PlayStation port displaying the player's equipped weapon in their hands or the Nintendo 64 port having a different, simpler HUD. The Game Boy Color port was the only exception, having radically different gameplay due to the platform's technical limitations: gameplay is slowed and simplified, crossfire is removed, and the 3D graphics from other releases are replaced by a 2D top-down perspective.

Plot
In 1999, in response to a post-Cold War rise in terrorism, the world's military, law enforcement, and intelligence agencies form "Rainbow", a top secret multinational counterterrorist organization led by John Clark.

In 2000, Rainbow responds to a series of terrorist attacks linked to the Phoenix Group eco-terrorist organization. Rainbow's operations against Phoenix are assisted by John Brightling, chairman of the powerful biotechnology corporation Horizon Inc., whose facilities are frequently targeted by Phoenix; Anne Lang, the Science Advisor to the President of the United States and an acquaintance of Brightling; and Catherine Winston, a biological expert working with Horizon who is rescued by Rainbow following an attack in the Congo.

After a raid on a Phoenix compound in Idaho that reveals unethical human experimentation, Rainbow learns the Phoenix Group is a front for Horizon. Viewing humanity as an environmentally destructive "disease", Brightling plans to exterminate most of humanity using a highly contagious manmade strain of the Ebola virus called "Brahma", sparing only his chosen few, who will rebuild Earth into a scientific environmental utopia. To achieve this, Brightling has engineered terrorist attacks to exploit heightened terrorism concerns and secure a contract for his private security firm Global Security at the 2000 Summer Olympics in Sydney. Global Security's personnel, led by William Hendrickson, will then release Brahma at the Olympics, spreading the virus across the world when the athletes and spectators return home.

After gathering intelligence and rescuing Winston from a last-ditch attempt to silence her, Rainbow apprehends Lang and Hendrickson and prevents Brahma's release at the Olympic Village, foiling Brightling's plans. Brightling and his collaborators flee to their Horizon Ark facility in the Amazon rainforest, where they planned to weather out the Brahma pandemic. Rainbow assaults the Ark, neutralizes Brightling's collaborators, and takes Brightling into custody.

Development

The idea of the game that would become Rainbow Six originated from early concepts Red Storm Entertainment had conceived following the company's formation in 1996. Selected from around 100 other ideas, the original concept, titled HRT, followed the FBI Hostage Rescue Team rescuing hostages from criminals and terrorists. HRT gradually expanded in scope with the addition of covert operations and a more international setting, and the game was renamed Black Ops. Red Storm CEO Doug Littlejohns, a former Royal Navy submarine commander and a close friend of Clancy's, did not want to develop an arcade shooter with "mindless violence", but also did not want a "boring" slow-paced strategy game, so the game was designed to focus on realism and action, with a strong emphasis on planning and strategy. The setting of Black Ops changed repeatedly early on, ranging from World War II, to 1960s spy fiction-esque Cold War espionage, to the near future, before finally settling on modern counterterrorism.

Rainbow Six—both the game and the novel—originated from a discussion between Littlejohns and Tom Clancy during a Red Storm company outing in 1996, when Littlejohns mentioned Black Ops. When Clancy mentioned that he was writing his own novel about a hostage rescue unit, their conversation led to Littlejohns noting the protracted diplomatic delays in authorizing a foreign counterterrorist unit's deployment overseas, and he suggested the formation of a permanent counterterrorist unit that already had authorization to deploy internationally. The name "Rainbow" came from the term "Rainbow nation", coined by Desmond Tutu to describe post-apartheid South Africa under Nelson Mandela's presidency. "Six" came from the American rank code for captain (O-6); though John Clark would more accurately be described as a major general (O-8), "Rainbow Six" read better than "Rainbow Eight". Lead game designer Brian Upton objected to the addition of "Six", believing having a number at the end of the title would affect a potential sequel, but he was overruled.

Following the game's development doctrine of realism, lead level designer John Sonedecker designed each level to be as accurate and realistic to real-world architecture as possible, noting that the presence of unusual design elements seen in other less-realistic shooters, such as unnecessarily large doorways or building layouts seemingly designed for combat, would ruin the player's immersion and affect gameplay. The development team had access to counterterrorism experts, military trainers, and technical consultants, and used their advice to ensure authenticity and streamline development by cutting mechanics deemed unrealistic or unnecessary, such as jumping. These technical advisors also provided motion capture for character animations.

By 1997, the game was very behind on schedule, and the developers started crunching. Many developers slept in a spare room of the office. Clancy's involvement in the development process was "minimal", only sending Red Storm an early manuscript of the novel to work plot details into the game (hence why the game's plot features different characters and a slightly different storyline). Clancy would insist the developers add features his experts claimed were realistic, such as the fictional heartbeat sensor used in the novel that functions as a radar-like equipment item in-game. In November 1997, the developers realized the game was becoming too demanding, only having single-digit frame rates on high-end devices, so a massive two-month overhaul was ordered. Despite these setbacks, development managed to progress relatively smoothly overall, and a gameplay demonstration at E3 1998 that unintentionally displayed AI teammates rescuing hostages by themselves boosted the game's publicity ahead of release.

Several weeks prior to the game's release on PC, early copies of the game were leaked onto online piracy websites. The users that uploaded the game files reportedly "took credit for 'cracking' a game with no copy protection in it", frustrating the developers; network programmer Dave Weinstein recalled going on a profanity-laden rant on the topic in Red Storm's office, only to be pulled aside by Littlejohns for his volume, having been heard three offices away.

The game's box art, featuring a Rainbow operative armed with a Heckler & Koch USP, was not created for the game and is actually a modified photograph of Heckler & Koch USA sales executive John T. Meyer. The original image was used to promote the American launch of the USP in 1993. Heckler & Koch permitted the use of the image for the game and sent firearms instructors to assist with motion capture.

The Nintendo 64, PlayStation, Game Boy Color, and Dreamcast releases of the game were each developed by separate companies: Saffire for the N64, Rebellion Developments for the PS1, Crawfish Interactive for the GBC, and Pipe Dream Interactive for the Dreamcast. Little is known about the development processes of these ports, though the release of the Dreamcast port was delayed by eight months.

Release
Tom Clancy's Rainbow Six was released for Windows on August 21, 1998 in North America and October 1998 in Europe. The game was published by Red Storm Entertainment in North America and Take-Two Interactive in Europe. The other ports of the game were released gradually over several months between late 1998 and early 2001; the final release of the game, the Dreamcast port, was released on May 9, 2000 in North America and February 2, 2001 in Europe, published by Majesco Entertainment.

After the release of the game, Tom Clancy offered to sign copies of the game for Red Storm employees, despite being relatively uninvolved in development, annoying several developers; as Upton opined, "Even though it had his name on the box, it wasn't his game. It was our game. He should have been asking us to sign a copy for him!"

The PAL port of the game was one of 20 games preloaded on the PlayStation Classic (excluding the Japan, Taiwan, and Hong Kong releases), released on December 3, 2018.

Rainbow Six Mission Pack: Eagle Watch 
Tom Clancy's Rainbow Six Mission Pack: Eagle Watch is an expansion pack of the original game, released for PC only on January 31, 1999. It adds five new missions, four new operatives from the Rainbow Six novel, three new weapons, and new multiplayer modes. The new missions, unrelated to each other or the original campaign, take place in 2001 and follow Rainbow's high-profile operations in landmark locations around the world, namely the Buran spaceplane in Russia, the Taj Mahal in India, the Forbidden City in China, the Palace of Westminster in the United Kingdom, and the Capitol in the United States. The expansion was packaged with the original game as Tom Clancy's Rainbow Six Gold Pack Edition in 1999.

Reception

Rainbow Six was met with mostly positive reviews on PC, though the console ports received relatively lower ratings. Review aggregator Metacritic displays a score of 85 out of 100 for the PC port. Video game review aggregator GameRankings displays scores of 82% for PC, 74% for the Nintendo 64, 48% for the PlayStation, 54% for the Game Boy Color, and 73% for the Dreamcast.

Overall gameplay was positively received. The game's difficulty and playstyle differences to contemporary shooters such as Quake II and GoldenEye 007 were highlighted by multiple reviewers, as was the detailed planning stage. Trent C. Ward, reviewing the PC port for IGN, praised the complexities of the planning stage, realistic damage, competent AI, and freedom to complete missions from multiple approaches, saying it was "unlike any first-person shooter yet made." PC Gamer US called the game "an enthralling package loaded to the brim with tense, nail-biting gameplay, slick technology, and excellent replayability", and "undoubtedly one of the most original and best games of the year." Jeremy Dunham of IGN, reviewing the Dreamcast port, praised the game's change in pace: "Long exposed to mindless romps and pointless first-person gore-fest clones, the ability to actually think and THEN destroy puts a big ol' smile on my face." Push Square Sam Brooke, reviewing the PlayStation port in a 2018 retrospective, enjoyed the sense of accomplishment from completing challenging missions properly, calling it "a trailblazer in its genre". Alan Dunkin of GameSpot noted the game could be difficult, but to the point of sometimes being frustrating.

Several reviews highlighted the game's realism and immersion. Dunkin stated "the immersive feeling of Rainbow Six is perhaps one of the best seen in a game." Christian Nutt, reviewing the Nintendo 64 port for GameSpot, said of the game, "realism is the order of the day ... this game does deliver a military simulation on a very personal level." Next Generation took note of the game's attempts at realism, but noted flaws in presentation such as the odd manner in which characters leaned around corners.

Multiplayer was singled out for praise, especially for the PC port. Ward praised the multiplayer functionality and its addictiveness, adding that "[f]or weeks now, the offices here have literally shut down as teams from IGN-PC, PC Gamer and PC Accelerator stop what they're doing to take each other on in a team deathmatch, or to cooperate on a difficult mission." Dunkin opined that the multiplayer "saves the game" from its other flaws. PC Gamer US favorably described the multiplayer functionality as "tense and exciting", but suggested the quick time-to-kill could make smaller matches simple and boring. Peter Olafson of GamePro said the multiplayer was "a nice-looking shooter" but noted lag issues.

However, AI issues and glitches were subject to considerable criticism. Raphael Liberatore, reviewing the game for Computer Gaming World, criticized "faulty AI and game-killing bugs" for impeding "what could have been a benchmark game—a game troubled by what it could have been." Olafson singled out the lack of variation in AI behavior, with enemies always remaining idle and teammates only moving in single-file lines. Brooke criticized AI pathfinding through narrow corridors, recounting one mission where it took longer to extract a hostage than it did to find them in the first place. Ward also recalled experiencing notable glitches and instances of teammate AI obstructing him, but opined such issues could easily be overlooked during gameplay.

Console ports 
The Nintendo 64 port was well-received by most reviewers. Aaron Boulding of IGN said the only issue with the port was the shortened campaign, but Nutt considered the short length to be acceptable, viewing the multiple difficulty levels and the co-op mode as making up for it. Electronic Gaming Monthly highlighted the port's detailed graphics yet smooth framerate as impressive for the Nintendo 64, especially without having to resort to render fog. Mike Wolf of Next Generation gave it three stars out of five, stating that though it was "a fantastic game", its flaws meant it was "not a must-have". In a 2018 retrospective, N64 Today said it still stood up 20 years after its release, though it had noticeable graphical issues, especially if not played on a CRT display.

The PlayStation port was widely panned as inferior to other ports. Official U.S. PlayStation Magazine gave it one star out of five. Christian Nutt of GameSpot lambasted it as "awkward" and "aesthetically bankrupt", noting its apparent abandonment of the team leadership aspect, deeming it "an uninspired FPS with some weird hostage-saving minigame tacked on." IGN's Matt White criticized its unusually poor graphics, and called it "a mighty fine example for impressionable young developers of how not to handle a port." Brooke called the PlayStation port "janky" and "unpolished", but gave it credit for the game's influence.

The Game Boy Color port received mixed reviews. IGN's Craig Harris criticized it for removing risk factors such as enemy effectiveness and crossfire, thus making most planning and tactics worthless, though he commended Crawfish Interactive's ambition in adapting a three-dimensional shooter to a two-dimensional handheld. Frank Provo of GameSpot criticized AI issues, gameplay repetition, and noticeable reuse of sprites and sounds, but still considered it a faithful port for what it was.

The Dreamcast port was very well-received. Garrett Kenyon of Next Generation gave it four stars out of five, calling it "[a]n impressive PC translation that Dreamcast owners should certainly consider owning." Erik Wolpaw, reviewing the Dreamcast port for GameSpot, noted it was a faithful port of the PC game and was "as deep and challenging as action games get", though he critiqued the lack of multiplayer, long loading times, and unusually complex method of issuing commands—over 35 exist, but require specific combinations of joystick button inputs. Dunham had the same criticisms, noting these issues still existed in the final release despite an eight-month delay in the port's development, but nonetheless deemed it "one of the deepest, most realistic games to inhabit the Dreamcast so far."

Eagle Watch 
Mike Lohrey of IGN reviewed the Eagle Watch expansion, praising its new levels and other additions but criticizing AI awareness issues and inconsistent damage mechanics compared to the original game. Liberatore, who had previously panned the original game, rated Eagle Watch 4.5 out of 5, stating it "vastly improved the original, AI included, making R6 the standout title it deserves to be."

Accolades 
The Academy of Interactive Arts & Sciences nominated Rainbow Six for its 1998 "Action Game of the Year" award, although the game lost to Half-Life. Rainbow Six was a finalist for Computer Gaming Worlds 1998 "Best Action" award, which ultimately went to Battlezone. The editors wrote that Rainbow Six "deftly mixed strategic planning with nail-biting action as it brought the world of counterterrorist operations to life." PC Gamer US named Rainbow Six the best action game of 1998. CNN, in partnership with Games.net, named Rainbow Six one of the "top 25 game downloads of 1998".

Sales 
In the United States, Rainbow Six Windows release sold 218,183 copies during 1998, accounting for $8.86 million in revenue that year. The PC port's Gold Edition release sold another 321,340 copies in the United States during 1999, and was the country's 12th best-selling computer game that year. According to Gamasutra, Rainbow Six and Rainbow Six: Rogue Spear together sold 450,000 copies "during the first half of the 2001/2002 fiscal year".

References

External links
 
 
 
 

1998 video games
Classic Mac OS games
Cooperative video games
Crawfish Interactive games
Dreamcast games
First-person shooters
Game Boy Color games
Multiplayer and single-player video games
Multiplayer online games
Nintendo 64 games
Pipe Dream Interactive games
PlayStation (console) games
PlayStation Network games
Red Storm Entertainment games
Tactical shooter video games
Take-Two Interactive games
Tom Clancy games
Tom Clancy's Rainbow Six
 01
Ubisoft games
Video games based on novels
Video games developed in the United States
Video games scored by Bill Brown
Video games set in 1999
Video games set in 2000
Video games set in 2001
Video games set in Belgium
Video games set in Brazil
Video games set in China
Video games set in the Democratic Republic of the Congo
Video games set in Hungary
Video games set in Idaho
Video games set in India
Video games set in Kazakhstan
Video games set in London
Video games set in Russia
Video games set in San Francisco
Video games set in Spain
Video games set in Sydney
Video games set in the United Kingdom
Video games set in Virginia
Video games set in Washington, D.C.
Video games with expansion packs
Windows games